Pediatric Allergy and Immunology is a peer-reviewed medical journal covering immunology and allergy as they relate to pediatrics. It was established in 1990 and is published eight times per year by John Wiley & Sons. It is the official journal of the European Academy of Allergy and Clinical Immunology. The editor-in-chief is Philippe Eigenmann. According to the Journal Citation Reports, the journal has a 2020 impact factor of 6.377, ranking it 6th out of 28 journals in the category "Allergy".

References

External links

Pediatrics journals
Immunology journals
Wiley (publisher) academic journals
Academic journals associated with international learned and professional societies of Europe
Publications established in 1990
English-language journals
8 times per year journals